Mulayam Singh Yadav (22 November 1939 – 10 October 2022) was an Indian politician, a socialist figure and the founder of the Samajwadi Party. In the course of his political career spanning more than six decades, he served for three terms as the Chief Minister of Uttar Pradesh, and also as the Minister of Defence in the Union Government. A long-time parliamentarian, he was a seven-time Member of Parliament representing Mainpuri, Azamgarh, Sambhal and Kannauj constituencies in the Lok Sabha, a ten-time member of the Legislative Assembly, member of the Legislative Council and the Leader of Opposition for several times as well. The veteran politician was a prominent figure of his time in Indian Politics, and was often referred to as Netaji (meaning respected leader in Hindi) and  Dhartiputra (son of mother earth) by party leaders and workers. In 2023, the socialist leader was posthumously conferred with Padma Vibhushan, India’s second highest civilian award by the Government of India.

Early life and education 
Mulayam Singh Yadav was born to Murti Devi and Sughar Singh Yadav on 22 November 1939 in Saifai village, Etawah district, Uttar Pradesh, India.  Akhilesh Yadav is his only son from his first marriage to Malti Devi.

Yadav earned three degrees in political science — a B.A. from Karm Kshetra Post Graduate College in Etawah, a B.T. from A. K. College in Shikohabad, and an M.A. from B. R. College, Agra University.

Teaching career 
Before joining politics, Yadav was engaged in teaching profession. In 1963, he was a lecturer at Jain Inter-College in Karhal, Mainpuri. In 1974, he was promoted to a lecturer after attaining his master's degree.

Political career 
Groomed by leaders such as Ram Manohar Lohia, Raj Narain, Anantram Jaiswal, Chandra Shekhar &  Yadav was first elected as a Member of the Legislative Assembly in  Legislative Assembly of Uttar Pradesh in 1967 from Jaswantnagar on a Samyukta Socialist Party (SSP) ticket the party founded by Anantram Jaiswal & George Fernandes. In 1975, during Indira Gandhi's imposition of the Emergency, Yadav was arrested and kept in custody for 19 months.

He first became a state minister in 1977. Later, in 1980, he became the president of the Lok Dal (People's Party) in Uttar Pradesh, which became a part of the Janata Dal (People's Party) afterwards. In 1982, he was elected leader of the opposition in the Uttar Pradesh Legislative Council and held that post until 1985. When the Lok Dal party split, Yadav launched the Krantikari Morcha party.

Chief Minister

First term 
Yadav first became Chief Minister of Uttar Pradesh in 1989.

In 1990, a large body of Sangh Parivar supporters reached Ayodhya and attempted to attack the 16th-century Babri mosque. They organized a march towards the mosque in an attempt to reclaim the land for a grand temple for Hindu god Rama. This resulted in a pitched battle with the paramilitary forces. In a bid for crowd control, firing by the police with live rounds was ordered by Yadav. At least 16 rioters were killed in the incident. The mosque was razed in 1992 by the Hindu mobs sparking religious violence across the country. Muslims credited Yadav for saving the mosque in 1990 and became the major voting bloc of Samajwadi Party.

The BJP withdrew its support to the V. P. Singh ministry, necessitating fresh elections. The BJP substantially increased its tally in the union parliament, as well as winning a majority in the Uttar Pradesh assembly.

After the collapse of the Union government led by V. P. Singh in November 1990, Yadav joined Chandra Shekhar's Janata Dal (Socialist) party and continued in office as chief minister with the support of the Indian National Congress (INC). His government fell when the INC withdrew its support in April 1991 in the aftermath of developments at the national level where it had earlier withdrawn its support for Chandra Shekhar's government. Mid-term elections to Uttar Pradesh assembly were held in mid-1991, in which Mulayam Singh's party lost power to the BJP.

Second term 
In 1992, Yadav founded his own Samajwadi Party (Socialist Party). In 1992, Hindu right wing mob was involved in the demolition of the Babri Mosque, which caused violence across India. In 1993, he allied with the Bahujan Samaj Party for the elections to the Uttar Pradesh assembly due to be held in November 1993. The alliance between Samajwadi Party and Bahujan Samaj Party prevented the return of BJP to power in the state.

In 1993, Yadav became the Chief minister of Uttar Pradesh for the second time. Yadav became chief minister of Uttar Pradesh with the support of Congress and Janata Dal. His stand on the movement for demanding separate statehood for Uttarakhand was as controversial as his stand on the Ayodhya movement in 1990 was. There was a firing on Uttarakhand activists at Muzaffarnagar on 2 October 1994, something for which Uttarakhand activists held him responsible. He continued holding that post until his ally opted into another alliance in June 1995.

Third term  
In 2002, following a fluid post-election situation in Uttar Pradesh, the Bharatiya Janata Party and Bahujan Samaj Party joined to form a government under Dalit leader Mayawati, who was considered to be Yadav's greatest political rival in the state. The BJP pulled out of the government on 25 August 2003, and enough rebel legislators of the Bahujan Samaj Party left to allow Yadav to become the Chief Minister, with the support of independents and small parties. He was sworn in as chief minister of Uttar Pradesh for the third time in September 2003.

Yadav was still a member of the Lok Sabha when he was sworn in as chief minister. In order to meet the constitutional requirement of becoming a member of state legislature within six months of being sworn in, he contested the assembly by-election from Gunnaur assembly seat in January 2004. Yadav won by a record margin of 1,83,899 votes, polling 91.45 per cent of the votes.

With the hope of playing a major role at the centre, Yadav contested the 2004 Lok Sabha elections from Mainpuri while still Chief Minister of Uttar Pradesh. He won the seat and his Samajwadi Party won more seats in Uttar Pradesh than all other parties. However, the Congress party, which formed the coalition government at the centre after the elections, had the majority in the Lok Sabha with the support of the Communist parties. As a result, Yadav could not play any significant role at the centre. Yadav resigned from the Lok Sabha and chose to continue as chief minister of Uttar Pradesh until the 2007 elections, when he lost to the BSP.

Member of Parliament 
He was elected to the Uttar Pradesh Legislative Assembly ten times and to the Parliament of India, Lok Sabha seven times.

Minister of Defence for India  
In 1996, Yadav was elected to the eleventh Lok Sabha from Mainpuri constituency. In the United Front coalition government formed that year, his party joined and he was named India's Defence Minister in the Deve Gowda ministry. That government fell in 1998 as India went in for fresh elections, but he returned to the Lok Sabha that year from Sambhal parliamentary constituency. After the fall of Atal Bihari Vajpayee union government in April 1999, he did not support the Congress party in the formation of the union government.

Second term, 1999 General election 
He contested the Lok Sabha general elections of 1999 from two seats, Sambhal Lok Sabha constituency and Kannauj Lok Sabha constituency, and won both seats. He resigned from the Kannauj seat for his son Akhilesh in the by-elections.

Sixth term, 2014 General election 
He was elected in the 2014 Indian general election. He became a MP in the 16th Lok Sabha from Azamgarh and Mainpuri. The competing party BJP did not field a strong candidate in the election from Mainpuri. In June 2014 he resigned from Mainpuri seat and continued to represent Azamgarh in Parliament.

In May 2017, two Indian soldiers were killed and their bodies were mutilated by Pakistan's Border Action Team. When Yadav, who had served as the Defence Minister in past, was asked by journalists to comment on the attacks, he responded by saying "Defence Minister (Arun Jaitley) is weak and coward can never take on enemies. I have one question for the union government and the minister concerned: why are you not able to muster courage to show the enemy their place." He also said that during his term as defence minister in the Deve Gowda ministry, he had ordered the Indian Army to cross into Pakistan in response to attacks.He was responsible for the killing of karsewaks during Ram mandir andolan.

Seventh term, 2019 General election 
He was re-elected in the 2019 Indian general election from Mainpuri for a fifth time. This was his fourth consecutive victory from the same constituency. He died in 2022, two years before the end of his term.

Samajwadi Party 
In 1992, Yadav founded his own Samajwadi Party (Socialist Party). Muslims make a sizeable minority in the Uttar Pradesh state. Samajwadi Party and Yadav emerged as the advocates for Muslims.

Since the young Akhilesh Yadav became Chief Minister of Uttar Pradesh in 2012, surpassing Mulayam's brother Shivpal Singh Yadav, the Yadav family was divided into two feuding groups. One of the groups, led by Akhilesh, enjoyed the support of his father's cousin and National General Secretary Ram Gopal Yadav. The rival group was led by Mulayam Singh and supported by his brother and State Chief of Party, Shivpal Yadav, and a friend, former MP Amar Singh. Akhilesh had fired his uncle twice from his cabinet as it was seen by many as a direct challenge to his father, who has steadily supported Shivpal over Akhilesh. On 30 December 2016, Mulayam Yadav expelled his son Akhilesh and his cousin Ram Gopal from the party for six years on the grounds of indiscipline, only to revoke the decision 24 hours later. Akhilesh, in response, stripped his father of the party presidency and instead named him the chief patron of the party following the national convention of the party on 1 January 2017. Mulayam termed the national convention illegal and directly expelled his cousin, Ram Gopal Yadav, who had convened the national executive convention. But the Election commission of India ruled that Ram Gopal Yadav had the right to convene that executive convention, and reversed Mulayam's order. Hence Akhilesh Yadav officially became the new national leader of the party.

Positions held 
Mulayam Singh Yadav had been elected 10 times as MLA and 7 times as Lok Sabha MP.

Politicial positions

Socialism 
He followed Socialism. In the 1980s the Union Government of India had appointed Mandal Commission, a federal commission to identify the "socially backward classes" in India. The appointment led to protests across the country. During these protests Yadav defended the demands of the backward castes and religious minorities. Through these protests Yadav emerged as a socialist leader.

Support for a sovereign independent Tibet 
Yadav said it is necessary for India to support a sovereign and independent Tibet. He said that a past government had made a "big mistake" on the issue and noted that he had spoken against it at the time. He believed that Tibet was a traditional buffer between China and India and that India should support the Dalai Lama and Tibetan independence. Claiming that China had secreted nuclear weapons in Pakistan, he cautioned that "China is our enemy, not Pakistan. Pakistan can do us no damage".

Controversies

Comment on rape 
The crime of rape became a capital offence in India following the 2012 Delhi gang rape incident. Following the trial in the Shakti Mills gang rape, on 10 April 2014, in an election rally, Yadav said, "When boys and girls have differences, the girl gives a statement that 'the boy raped me,' and that poor boy gets a death sentence." Referring to the Mumbai gang rape he stated, "... later they had differences, and the girl went and gave a statement that I have been raped. And then the poor fellows, three of them have been sentenced to death. Should rape cases lead to hanging? Boys are boys, they make mistakes. Two or three have been given the death sentence in Mumbai." Following this, complaints were filed against Yadav with the Election Commission and the National Commission for Women (NCW). His comments were denounced by the Indian media, women's groups, women's rights activists, public prosecutor in the Shakti Mills gang rape case Ujjwal Nikam, Bollywood celebrities, and a large section of Uttar Pradesh residents.

In response to 2014 Badaun gang rape and Yadav's comments, UN Secretary-General Ban Ki-moon said "We say no to the dismissive, destructive attitude of, 'Boys will be boys. On 19 August 2015, Yadav remarked that gang-rapes are impractical and rape-victims in those cases tend to lie. He was summoned by the Judicial Magistrate of Mahoba district court in Uttar Pradesh for that remark.

Phone Threat case 

On 10 July 2015, ex Indian Police Service officer and President Adhikar Sena, Amitabh Thakur allegedly got a phone call from Yadav. Thakur alleged that Yadav had threatened him over the phone call. He released the audio of the phone call, in which Yadav is allegedly heard saying certain sentences, which Thakur called as being threatening in nature. Thakur alleged that Mulayam Singh was unhappy about the complaint lodged by his wife activist and advocate Nutan Thakur against the then state mining minister Gayatri Prasad Prajapati.      

On 11 July 2015, Thakur presented a complaint before Hazratganj police station for registration of FIR against Yadav as regards the alleged phone threat, which the Police refused to register. On the contrary, in the same night of 11 July, a rape case was registered against Thakur by the Lucknow police at Gomtinagar police station, which raised political storm. Later FIR was registered in this case on Court intervention, which the Police closed but Thakur went on pursuing it before Court. The matter remained inconclusive till the end.

Personal life and death
Yadav was married twice. His first wife, Malti Devi, was in a vegetative state from 1974 until her death in May 2003 following complications while giving birth to their only child, Akhilesh Yadav. Akhilesh was Chief Minister of Uttar Pradesh from 2012 to 2017.

Mulayam had a relationship with Sadhana Gupta while still married to Malti Devi in the 1990s. Gupta was not well known until February 2007, when the relationship was admitted in India's Supreme Court. Sadhana Gupta had a son named Prateek Yadav (born 1988), from her first marriage to Chandra Prakash Gupta. Sadhana Gupta died in July 2022 after a brief illness.

Family tree

Mulayam Singh Yadav had four brothers and a sister, Kamla Devi. Ram Gopal Yadav and his sister Geeta Devi are his cousins. The family tree of Yadav family is as follows:

Death

In September 2022, Yadav was admitted to hospital and put on a ventilator after his condition deteriorated. He had been hospitalized for a month. Yadav died on 10 October 2022 at age 82 in a hospital in Gurgaon. His last rites were performed with full state honours at his hometown Saifai.

In popular culture 
Main Mulayam Singh Yadav, an Indian Hindi-language biographical film by Suvendu Raj Ghosh based on his life, was released in 2021; with Amyth Sethi playing the title role.

Electoral performance

References

Further reading 
Samajwadi Supremo Mulayam singh yadav passed away

External links 

 Profile on Samajwadi Party website

1939 births
2022 deaths
Chief ministers from Janata Dal
Chief ministers from Samajwadi Party
Chief Ministers of Uttar Pradesh
Defence Ministers of India
Dr. Bhimrao Ambedkar University alumni
India MPs 1996–1997
India MPs 1998–1999
India MPs 1999–2004
India MPs 2004–2009
India MPs 2009–2014
India MPs 2014–2019
India MPs 2019–present
Leaders of the Opposition in the Uttar Pradesh Legislative Assembly
Leaders of the Opposition in the Uttar Pradesh Legislative Council
Lok Sabha members from Uttar Pradesh
People from Saifai
Samajwadi Janata Party politicians
Uttar Pradesh MLAs 1977–1980
Uttar Pradesh MLAs 1989–1991
Uttar Pradesh MLAs 1993–1996
V. P. Singh administration
Yadav family of Uttar Pradesh
Recipients of the Padma Vibhushan in public affairs